Persatuan Olahraga Sepakbola Labuhan Batu (simply known as Poslab Labuhan Batu) is an Indonesian football club based in Labuhan Batu Regency, North Sumatra. They currently compete in the Liga 3.

References

Football clubs in Indonesia
Football clubs in North Sumatra
Association football clubs established in 1952
1952 establishments in Indonesia